VCCI may also refer to:

Voluntary Control Council for Interference by Information Technology Equipment
Vietnam Chamber of Commerce and Industry